Arbonne is a commune in the Pyrénées-Atlantiques department in the Nouvelle-Aquitaine region of southwestern France.

The inhabitants of the commune are known as Arbonars

Geography
Arbonne is located some 6 km south of Biarritz and 3 km east of Bidart. It is part of the Urban area of Bayonne and is located in the former province of Labourd. Access to the commune is by road D255 from Biarritz in the north passing through the village and continuing south to Saint-Pée-sur-Nivelle. The D655 branches off the D255 in the south of the commune and goes to Ahetze. The A63 autoroute passes through the northern tip of the commune but has no access from the commune. In the south of the commune is the hamlet of Le Hameau d'Arbonne. The rest of the commune is mainly farmland with patches of forest especially in the north.

Located in the drainage basin of the Adour, the commune is traversed by the Uhabia, a small coastal river that flows into the ocean at Bidart, and its tributaries: the Zirikolatzeko erreka and the Ruisseau d'Argelos.

The Ruisseau de Pemartin also flows through the commune and there is an extensive network of streams throughout the commune.

Places and Hamlets

 Aguerrea
 Alhorga
 Allexarrea
 Arditegia
 Arretxea
 Berrueta
 Cassoua
 Diharzenea
 Etchardia
 Guichenea
 Gure Egoitza
 le Hameau d'Arbonne
 Harriague
 Hegoasea
 Katalienea
 Kuttuenea
 Larreburua
 Magnienea
 Menta
 Mestelan Beherea
 Mestelania
 Moleresia
 Mundustenea
 Pemartikoborda
 Pemartin
 Perukain
 La Place
 le Pouy
 Saskoenea
 Tribulenea
 Xantxienea
 Xokobia
 Ziburria
 Ziburriako Errota

Toponymy
The commune name in Basque is Arbona.

Brigitte Jobbé-Duval indicated that 'Arbona meant "place of tree stumps".

The following table details the origins of the commune name and other names in the commune.

Sources:
Raymond: Topographic Dictionary of the Department of Basses-Pyrenees, 1863, on the page numbers indicated in the table. 

Origins:
Bayonne: Cartulary of Bayonne or Livre d'Or (Book of Gold)
Collations: Collations of the Diocese of Bayonne
Chapter: Titles of the Chapter of Bayonne
Intendance: Intendance of Pau

History
The oldest lord of Arbonne whose names are known are from the Sault family, Viscounts of Labourd. At the end of the 14th century the lordship was owned by the Saint-Julien family (originally from Lower Navarre) and then in 1408 to the Amezqueta family.

The Act of 4 March 1790, which determined the new administrative landscape of France by creating departments and districts, created the Department of Basses-Pyrénées to bring together Béarn, the Gascon lands in Bayonne and Bidache, and three French Basque provinces. For these three provinces three districts were created: Mauléon, Saint-Palais, and Ustaritz which replaced the Bailiwick of Labourd. The seat of Ustaritz was transferred almost immediately to Bayonne. Its Directorate pushed many municipalities into adopting new names conforming to the spirit of the Revolution. Arbonne was called Constante, Ustaritz became Marat-sur-Nive, Itxassou Union, Saint-Étienne-de-Baïgorry Thermopyles, Saint-Palais Mont-Bidouze, Saint-Jean-Pied-de-Port Nive-Franche, Louhossoa Montagne-sur-Nive, Saint-Jean-de-Luz Chauvin-Dragon, Ainhoa Mendiarte, and Souraïde Mendialde.

Heraldry

Administration
List of Successive Mayors

Mayors from 1943

Inter-communality
Arbonne is part of nine inter-communal structures:
 the Communauté d'agglomération du Pays Basque;
 the SIVOM of Arbonne-Arcangues-Bassussarry;
 the SIVU of Arbonne-Bidart;
 the Ouhabia association;
 the mixed association of Bizi Garbia;
 the Association for promotion of basque culture;
 the mixed association for management of Ura drinking water;
 the mixed association for sanitation in Ura;
 the Energy association of Pyrénées-Atlantiques.

The commune is part of the Eurocité basque Bayonne-San Sebastian  (fr) (a cross-border association to develop the area from Bayonne in France to San Sebastian in Spain).

Demography
In 2017 the commune had 2,223 inhabitants.

Economy
The commune is part of the Appellation d'origine contrôlée (AOC) zone of Ossau-iraty.

Culture and heritage

According to the Map of the Seven Basque Provinces by Prince Louis-Lucien Bonaparte the basque dialect spoken in Arbonne is northern Upper Navarrese

Religious heritage
The commune has two buildings that are registered as historical monuments:
The Church of Saint-Laurent (12th century). It is of a medium size with an arched Bell-gable characteristic of Labourd religious buildings. Some old Hilarri are visible in the cemetery.
The old Benoîterie d'Arbonne (16th century) The Benoîterie  was the residence of the Benoîte or guardian of the church and cemetery and is now the venue for exhibitions (paintings, crafts).

Facilities
Health
The commune has a general practitioner, three nurses, a speech therapist, a physiotherapist, and a dentist - all in the village centre.

Education
Arbonne has two primary schools, one public and one private (Saint-Laurent school)

Notable people linked to the commune
Jean Borotra - called the Basque bondissant (the Bounding Basque), born in 1898 at Biarritz and died in 1994 at Arbonne, a tennis player and French politician
Bernard Béreau, born in 1940 at Arbonne and died in 2005, he was a French footballer
Marie-Michèle Beaufils, born in 1949 at Arbonne, she is a contemporary writer

See also
Communes of the Pyrénées-Atlantiques department

Bibliography
 Arbonne, Arbona, Collective work under the direction of Hubert Lamant-Duhart, Ekaina, 1988

References

External links
Arbonne official website 
ARBONA in the Bernardo Estornés Lasa - Auñamendi Encyclopedia (Euskomedia Fundazioa) 
Arbonne on Géoportail, National Geographic Institute (IGN) website 
Arbonne on the 1750 Cassini Map

Communes of Pyrénées-Atlantiques